Maria Anna of Spain (18 August 160613 May 1646) was a Holy Roman Empress and Queen of Hungary and Bohemia by marriage to Ferdinand III, Holy Roman Emperor.  She acted as regent on several occasions during the absences of her spouse, notably during his absence in Bohemia in 1645.  

Daughter of King Philip III of Spain and Margaret of Austria, prior to her Imperial marriage she was considered a possible wife for Charles, Prince of Wales; the event, later known in history as the "Spanish match", provoked a domestic and political crisis in the Kingdoms of England and Scotland. In the imperial court in Vienna she continued to be strongly influenced by her native Spanish culture (from clothes to music) and also to promote the strengthening of relations between the Imperial and Spanish branches of the House of Habsburg.

Life

Early years 

Infanta Maria Anna of Spain was born in the Palace of El Escorial, near Madrid, on 18 August 1606 as the fourth child and third (but second surviving) daughter of King Philip III of Spain and his wife Margaret of Austria, Archduchess of the Inner Austrian branch of the House of Habsburg. Of her seven siblings, only four survived infancy: Anna (later wife of King Louis XIII of France), Philip IV of Spain, Charles (who died young in 1632) and Ferdinand (the later known Cardinal-Infante and Governor of the Spanish Netherlands). Maria Anna's parents had a close kinship: her father was her mother's first cousin once-removed and they were related through multiple lines of descent. On her father's side she was the granddaughter of King Philip II of Spain, and his fourth wife and niece Archduchess Anna of Austria, and on her mother's side she was the granddaughter of Charles II, Archduke of Inner Austria and his wife and niece Princess Maria Anna of Bavaria.

Betrothal 

From early childhood, Maria Anna played an important role in the matrimonial projects of her father. In adolescence she was betrothed to Archduke John-Charles, eldest son and heir of Ferdinand II, Holy Roman Emperor and his first wife Maria Anna of Bavaria. Her fiancé was her first cousin, being the son of her mother's brother. The marriage never took place due to Archduke John-Charles' early death in 1618.

In 1622, King James I of England received an offer from the Spanish King Philip IV to strengthen the relations of their countries through a dynastic marriage between Charles, Prince of Wales, and Infanta Maria Anna. London and Madrid began active negotiations. The possible marriage between the Prince of Wales and the Spanish Infanta, was known in history under the name "Spanish match", and caused an internal political crisis in both England and Scotland. In 1623 the Prince of Wales, accompanied by George Villiers, 1st Duke of Buckingham, visited Madrid to meet his intended bride. However, Maria Anna did not wish to marry a Protestant and Charles would not convert to Catholicism. At the end, the wedding never took place not only for political reasons but also because of the reluctance of the new Spanish King to conclude a dynastic marriage with the House of Stuart. Charles eventually married Henrietta Maria of France.

Marriage 
At the end of 1626, Maria Anna was betrothed to Ferdinand, the younger brother of her first fiancé, and the new heir of Emperor Ferdinand II. Ferdinand was her first cousin, being the son of her mother's brother. The formal engagement was preceded by a series of negotiations which were conducted in 1625. That same year, Ferdinand was crowned King of Hungary, and in 1627 King of Bohemia. In the negotiations were included all the life aspects of the Infanta at the court of her future spouse. Despite the desire of the groom that Maria Anna's confessor would be the Jesuit Ambrosio Peñalosa, the appointment eventually went to Capuchin Diego Quiroga. In the marriage contract signed by both parties in 1628, it was noted that Maria Anna could retain her rights of inheritance over the Spanish throne, while her older sister Infanta Anna, married to King Louis XIII of France in 1615, was forced to renounce her rights.

Maria Anna had left Madrid for Vienna in December 1629, fully three years after her engagement, and nearly five years after the proposal for marriage was first mooted. The journey, once embarked upon, took more than a year to complete. On route by sea, in Genoa complications arose due to an epidemic of the plague that erupted in the Italian Peninsula. For this reason, the party was unable to stop in Bologna, where Cardinal Antonio Barberini (nephew of Pope Urban VIII), was waiting for the Infanta to give her the Golden Rose. The party moved to Naples, where Maria Anna finally received the award. Leaving Naples, the Infanta crossed the Papal States, having made a pilgrimage to the Basilica della Santa Casa. On this section of her journey, Maria Anna was accompanied by Roman aristocracy, led by another nephew of Pope Urban VIII, Taddeo Barberini, Prince of Palestrina. On 26 January 1631, she arrived in Trieste, where she met Archduke Leopold Wilhelm of Austria, her future brother-in-law, who would first stand in for his brother at a wedding-by-proxy and then escort the Infanta to Vienna. That very day, Maria Anna was married to King Ferdinand of Hungria-Bohemia per procura with Archduke Leopold Wilhelm serving as the proxy.

Before the official wedding, King Ferdinand, not trusting the previous portraits that he had seen of the Infanta, decided to secretly view his bride. The Royal oberhofmeister asked for an audience with Maria Anna; on this visit, he was accompanied by some nobles, among whom was her groom. Struck by the beauty of the Infanta, King Ferdinand immediately revealed his identity and began a conversation with Maria Anna in Spanish. The love and respect that the future emperor felt for his wife lasted throughout their marriage. He was never unfaithful to her and never had any illegitimate children.

In Vienna on 20 February 1631, Maria Anna was married to King Ferdinand of Hungary-Bohemia. The festivities lasted a whole month. The marriage was described as friendly. Maria Anna was described as happy-tempered, friendly, and intelligent, and she was able to relieve the feelings of the rather melancholic Ferdinand.

Holy Roman Empress and German Queen 

Maria Anna arrived at the Imperial court in Vienna with the Spanish fashion, theatre, dance and music (including the first sounded guitar). As the wife of the heir, she maintained good relations with all the members of her husband's family; however, she had a complicated relationship with Ferdinand's stepmother, the Empress Dowager Eleonora Gonzaga, mainly because between both began a competition for influence at the Imperial court. Maria Anna also paid much attention to the arts, especially painting. She collected works of Italian, Spanish and Flemish painters of the late Renaissance and early Baroque.

In Regensburg on 22 December 1636 Ferdinand was elected as King of the Romans, and a week later he was crowned by the Archbishop of Mainz. Maria Anna was crowned Queen of Germany one month later, on 21 January 1637. After his father's death on 15 February 1637, Ferdinand became Holy Roman Emperor under the regnal name of Ferdinand III and also became sovereign King of Hungary and Bohemia. As his wife, she received the titles of Holy Roman Empress and sovereign Queen. Her coronation as Queen of Hungary took place in Pressburg during the Hungarian Diet of 1637–1638.

Maria Anna, being active in politics as the adviser of her spouse, was an important mediator between the Emperor and their Spanish relatives. Despite the fact that she always defended the interests of her husband, she did not forget the interests of her brothers King Philip IV and the Cardinal-Infante. In her court, which was consisted mainly of Spaniards, frequent guests were the Spanish ambassador and diplomats. The Emperor, during his absences from the Imperial court in Vienna, appointed his wife as regent, for example in 1645 during the Thirty Years' War, when he was in the Kingdom of Bohemia.

Death 
In March 1645 Maria Anna and her children left Linz, due to the approach of the Protestant Swedish army, and moved to Vienna. By April it was ready to cross the Danube there and threatened to occupy the city.  The Imperial family fled instead temporarily to Graz. After returning  to Vienna, they were forced to move again to Linz because of the plague. The Empress' sixth pregnancy became known in January 1646; four months later, on 12 May at Linz Castle, Maria Anna suddenly felt ill with fever and heavy bleeding and died the next morning. Her unborn child, a girl, was taken out alive from her womb. She was named Maria after her mother, but only lived a few hours. On 24 May both mother and daughter in the same coffin were moved to Vienna and buried in the Imperial Crypt, which already contained the coffins with the remains of the two sons of the Empress who died earlier. The funeral cortege was accompanied by the Spanish ambassador and the Empress' maid of honor. Very upset by the death of his wife and child, the Emperor was unable to attend the funeral. However, after returning to Vienna in late August he finally paid his respects to the remains of Maria Anna, and in September he announced the engagement of their eldest daughter Maria Anna with Balthasar Charles, Prince of Asturias. However, the Prince died the following month shortly after the announcement. The Spaniards courtiers members of the late Empress' household who came with her from Spain, including her confessor and the maids of honor of the late Empress, stayed at the Imperial court in Vienna and lived there for a few more years after her death.

Issue
During her marriage, Maria Anna gave birth to six children:
 Ferdinand IV (8 September 1633 – 9 July 1654), King of the Romans and titular King of Hungary and Bohemia.
 Maria Anna (22 December 1634 – 16 May 1696), who married her maternal uncle King Philip IV of Spain.
 Philip August (15 July 1637 – 22 June 1639), Archduke of Austria.
 Maximilian Thomas (21 December 1638 – 29 June 1639), Archduke of Austria.
 Leopold I, Holy Roman Emperor (9 June 1640 – 5 May 1705).
 Maria (born and died 13 May 1646), Archduchess of Austria.

Ancestors

Depictions in art 
Jowitt views the character of princess Donusa in Massinger's 1624 play The Renegado as an allegory of the Infanta during the failed marriage attempt.

In 1634, the Spanish poet and playwright Pedro Calderón de la Barca, in honor of the victory of the Spaniards and Austrians over the Swedes in the Battle of Nördlingen, set in Madrid a performance in which Maria Anna with her husband was one of the actors.

Save a few portraits of Maria Anna as child, almost all of them are included in the collection of the Kunsthistorisches Museum in Vienna. In the earliest of these paintings, made by Juan Pantoja de la Cruz, she is shown at one year of age. The collection of the Portland Art Museum includes a 1630s portrait of Maria, painted by Felipe Diriksen. A portrait of the Infanta Maria Anna, then Queen of Hungary and Bohemia, made by Diego Velázquez, court painter at Madrid, was part of the collection of the Museo del Prado. Portraits of the Empress made by Frans Luycx (painter at the court in Vienna), Bartolomé González y Serrano, Rodrigo de Villandrando, Justus Sustermans, Juan van der Hamen and other unknown authors are also stored in the collections of the Kunsthistorisches Museum, Museo del Prado, the gallery of the Schloss Esterházy in Eisenstadt and the Musée Fesch in Ajaccio.

Notes

References 
 Bettina Braun, Katrin Keller, Matthias Schnettger: Nur die Frau des Kaisers?: Kaiserinnen in der Frühen Neuzeit, Böhlau ed., Vienna 2016 .
 M. Hengerer: Kaiser Ferdinand III. (1608—1657). Eine Biographie , Böhlau ed., Vienna, Köln, Weimar 2012 .
  Habsburg, Maria Anna von Spanien, Biographisches Lexikon des Kaiserthums Oesterreich, Vienna Kaiserlich-königliche Hof- und Staatsdruckerei, p. 52 – 458 p.

External links 
Worldroots.com

1606 births
1646 deaths
17th-century viceregal rulers
Austrian princesses
Austrian royal consorts
Bohemian queens consort
Deaths in childbirth
German queens consort
Holy Roman Empresses
17th-century House of Habsburg
Hungarian queens consort
Portuguese infantas
Spanish infantas
17th-century women rulers
17th-century women of the Holy Roman Empire
Spanish people of Austrian descent
Castilian infantas
Aragonese infantas
Burials at the Imperial Crypt
Wives of Ferdinand III, Holy Roman Emperor
Daughters of kings